The Professional Institute of the Public Service of Canada (PIPSC) is the largest multi-professional labour union in Canada, representing some 60,000 public service professionals employed at the federal and some provincial and territorial levels of government. It was founded in 1920 to protect the interests of professional public employees. The institute became a bargaining agent following the implementation of the Public Service Staff Relations Act in 1967. It is the bargaining agent for more than 41 knowledge-based groups and negotiates with 27 different employers in six different jurisdictions.

The institute serves its members with approximately 140 full-time staff in its national office in Ottawa, and regional offices in Halifax, Montreal, Toronto, Winnipeg, Edmonton, and Vancouver.

External links
 
 PIPSC on Facebook
 PIPSC on Twitter

Trade unions established in 1920
Trade unions in Canada